The Stoke Potters previously the Hanley Potters were a British speedway team competing in the National League. As Stoke, the team raced at Loomer Road Stadium in Newcastle-under-Lyme. As Hanley Potters they raced from 1929 to 1963.

History
Hanley Potters were inaugural members of the 1929 Speedway English Dirt Track League but withdrew during the season and their results were expunged. They rode at the Sun Street Stadium in Hanley. In the late 1940s, early 1950s and the early 1960s, the club attracted crowds of over 12,000. 

Hanley won the National League Division Three and Div 3 National Trophy in 1949. The Sun Street track closed in 1963 after the greyhound stadium owners sold the site to a garage business.

The team returned in 1972 riding at a new venue the Loomer Road Stadium; they were known for one season as Chesterton Potters. From 1973 to 1995 they competed mainly in the National League.

In 1996, The team rode as the Cradley & Stoke Heathens, after  the Cradley Heath team were displaced from their base at Dudley Wood Stadium, Cradley Heath.

November 2010 saw a major decision taken by the club's promotion. The team were to withdraw from Premier League racing to drop a division and compete in the National League, speedway's third tier. The club had been struggling financially for the last couple of seasons and the move was made in order to stabilise finances and hopefully get on a sure footing to make a return to the Premier League later.

2011 saw the club top the National League table by seven points. Injuries struck key riders and this affected their final matches in which they were beaten in the play-off semi finals by the Mildenhall Fen Tigers who also beat them in the final of the National League Knockout Cup. Since the 2011 campaign the Potters have continued to race in the National League with little success and they ended 2015 season's National League table with only Kent Kings below them. On 13 July 2019, Stoke won the National League Fours for the second time.

Season summary

Season summary (juniors)

Previous seasons (riders)

2010 team

 
 
 

2009 team

2008 team

Also Rode:

2007 team

Also Rode

 (Garry suffered horrific injuries in a crash at Somerset.)

2006 team

Notable riders

References

National League speedway teams
Sport in Staffordshire
Sport in Stoke-on-Trent